The 1944 Pacific typhoon season has no official bounds; it ran year-round in 1944, but most tropical cyclones tend to form in the northwestern Pacific Ocean between June and December. These dates conventionally delimit the period of each year when most tropical cyclones form in the northwestern Pacific Ocean. The scope of this article is limited to the Pacific Ocean, north of the equator and west of the international date line. Storms that form east of the date line and north of the equator are called hurricanes; see 1944 Pacific hurricane season.

There were 23 tropical cyclones in 1944 in the western Pacific, including Typhoon Cobra.

Systems

Tropical Storm One

A long lived slow-moving and erratic tropical storm. The storm formed southwest of Micronesia, turned to the north and the west of Palau and made landfall in Mindanao.

Tropical Storm Two

Short-lived storm moving quickly to the northeast. There are many indications that this system was not tropical, such as attached fronts throughout its entire noted life.

Tropical Storm Three

The storm formed near Guam. The storm moved in a northern direction in the Pacific Ocean before dissipating on May 16.

Typhoon Four

This typhoon formed in the northwest of Micronesia, tracked to the northwest direction and recurved to the northeast of Philippines before dissipating.

Typhoon Cobra

Typhoon Cobra was first spotted on December 17, in the Philippine Sea. It sank three US destroyers, killing at least 790 sailors, before dissipating the next day.

See also

 List of Pacific typhoon seasons
 1900–1950 South-West Indian Ocean cyclone seasons
 1940s Australian region cyclone seasons
 1940s South Pacific cyclone seasons

References

External links
 USAtoday.com

1940s Pacific typhoon seasons
1944 natural disasters
1944 meteorology
1944 in Asia
1944 in Oceania